Rachel McQuillan and Lisa McShea were the defending champions but lost in the first round to Kerry-Anne Guse and Alicia Molik.

Cara Black and Elena Likhovtseva won in the final 6–1, 6–2 against Kimberly Po-Messerli and Nathalie Tauziat.

Seeds
Champion seeds are indicated in bold text while text in italics indicates the round in which those seeds were eliminated. The top four seeded teams received byes into the second round.

Draw

Finals

Top half

Bottom half

Qualifying draw

References
 2001 DFS Classic Draws
 ITF Tournament Page
 ITF doubles results page
 ITF doubles qualifying results page

DFS Classic - Doubles
Doubles